The 2008-09 Biathlon World Cup/World Cup 2 is the second event of the season and will be held in Hochfilzen, Austria. From Friday December 12 until Sunday December 14, 2008.

Schedule of events
The schedule of the event is below.

Medal winners

Men

Women

References

Biathlon World Cup - World Cup 2, 2008-09
2008 in Austrian sport
Biathlon competitions in Austria
Sport in Tyrol (state)
December 2008 sports events in Europe